A Presidential Commission of Inquiry is a major ad-hoc formal public inquiry into a defined issue ordered by the President of Sri Lanka to report findings, give advice and make recommendations.

Types
Two types of inquiries can be commissioned; 

 Commission of Inquiry appointed under the provisions of the Commission of Inquiry Act of 1948, which as since been amended in 1950, 1953, 1955 and 2008.
 Special Presidential Commission of Inquiry appointed under the provisions of the Special Presidential Commissions of Inquiry Law, No. 07 of 1978.

Powers

Commission of Inquiry
 Procure and receive all evidence (written or oral) regarding the matter inquired
 Examine all persons whom the commission thinks should be procured or examined as witnesses
 Require the evidence (written or oral) of any witness to be given on oath or affirmation
 Summon any person residing in Sri Lanka to attend any meeting of the commission to give evidence or produce any document or others in his possession, and to examine him as a witness or require him to produce any document or others in his possession
 Admit any evidence (written or oral) notwithstanding any of the provisions of the Evidence Ordinance
 to admit or exclude the public from the inquiry or any part
 to admit or exclude the press from the inquiry or any part
 to obtain certified copies of any proceedings of any case, any document, any other material filed or recorded at any Court of Law or at any tribunal and to require any person to produce any document or material which is in his/her possession or custody.
 to require any person to provide whatever the information which he/she possesses, in writing.

Special Presidential Commission of Inquiry
A Special Presidential Commission of Inquiry is more powerful than a Commission of Inquiry with powers;

to subject a person found guilty to civic disability, were as a Commission of Inquiry is a fact finding commission whose findings are not enforceable.
A report, finding, order, determination, ruling or recommendation made by a Special Presidential Commission cannot be questioned in any court or tribunal as well.

Membership
The President of Sri Lanka has the power to appoint a Commission of Inquiry under a presidential warrant with one or more members. In a Special Presidential Commission of Inquiry, the President will appoint of a member each of whom is a Judge of the Supreme Court, Court of Appeal, High Court or the District Court.

Notable commissions 
Commissions of Inquiry
 Commission to Enquire into Bribery in the State Council of Ceylon (The L. M. D. de Silva Commission) - 1941/1943 
 Commission of Inquiry to Investigate in the Colombo Municipal Council (The M. W. H. de Silva Commission) - 1949
Parliamentary Bribery Commission (The Thalagodapitiya Commission) - 1959
Lessons Learnt and Reconciliation Commission
Commission of Inquiry to Investigate and Inquire into Serious Violations of Human Rights (The Udalagama Commission)

Special Presidential Commissions of Inquiry
Presidential Commission of Inquiry on the Easter Attacks
Presidential Commission of Inquiry on Bond Issuance
Presidential Commission of Inquiry on the death of Lieutenant General Denzil Kobbekaduwa (The Tissa Dias Bandaranayake Commission)
Presidential Commission of Inquiry on the death of Lalith Athulathmudali (The Athulathmudali Commission)
Presidential Commission of Inquiry on the death of Vijaya Kumaratunga (The Vijaya Kumaratunga Commission)
Presidential Commission of Inquiry in relation to the activities of Non-Governmental Organizations
Presidential Commission of Inquiry in relation to the Malpractices and Corruption in State Institutions
Presidential Commission of Inquiry to investigate and inquire into Serious Acts of Fraud, Corruption and Abuse of Power, State Resources and Privileges (PRECIFAC)
Presidential Commission of Inquiry to inquire into the alleged VAT fraud at the Department of Inland Revenue (Paranagama Commission) 
Presidential Commission on the Disappeared (The Mahanama Tilakaratne Commission)
Presidential Commission of Inquiry to investigate the management of SriLankan Airlines and Mihin Lanka (during the period of January 2006 to January 2018).

See also
Royal Commission
Presidential Commission (United States)

References

Sri Lankan commissions and inquiries
Law of Sri Lanka